All My Hits: Todos Mis Éxitos Vol. 2 is a greatest hits album by American singer Selena and was released posthumously on February 29, 2000, through EMI Latin. In 1999, Selena remained EMI Latin's top-selling artist and outsold living musicians with her releases. President of EMI Latin Jose Behar, who discovered the singer at the 1989 Tejano Music Awards, recognized Selena for her contributions that made EMI Latin "the house that Selena built". To commemorate the label's tenth anniversary, they released All My Hits: Todos Mis Éxitos in March 1999 to commercial success and announced a follow-up. All My Hits: Todos Mis Éxitos Vol. 2 contains songs ranging from recordings found on Selena's Munequito de Trapo (1987) to the posthumous 1997 club remix of "Enamorada de Ti" (1990). Following Selena's death, her father Abraham Quintanilla expressed his interest in persevering his daughter's memory through her works. Selena's family has been criticized by fans and the media for exploiting the singer and cannibalizing her murder by commercializing her repertoire. 

The album received a positive response from music critics, who hailed it as an example of the singer's versatility and applauded its track listing which showcased Selena's ability in recording songs of various genres. The album peaked at number one on the US Billboard Top Latin Albums and Regional Mexican Albums chart, while it peaked at number 149 on the Billboard 200. Latin music columnist for Billboard, John Lannert believed All My Hits: Todos Mis Éxitos Vol. 2 is a testament to Selena's "legendary status" and her ability to still peak at number one, despite her death occurring five years prior. The album was the second best-selling Regional Mexican Album while it ranked at number 13 on the Top Latin Albums year-end chart. All My Hits: Todos Mis Éxitos Vol. 2 received a nomination for the Best Greatest Hits Album of the Year at the 2001 Billboard Latin Music Awards. In 2003, the album was certified double Platinum (Latin) by the Recording Industry Association of America (RIAA), denoting 200,000 units consisting of shipments in the United States.

Background 
On March 31, 1995, American Tejano music singer Selena was shot and killed by Yolanda Saldívar, her friend and former manager of the singer's boutiques. At the time of her death the singer was working on a crossover album that would have propelled her into the American pop market. The impact of the singer's death had a negative impact on Latin music, her genre—which she catapulted into the mainstream market—suffered and its popularity waned following Selena's death. The crossover-planned album Dreaming of You was released posthumously on July 18, 1995, debuting and peaking atop the United States Billboard 200 albums chart, the first majority Spanish-language recording to do so in the chart's history. The album's release started a "buying frenzy" for anything related or containing Selena among Hispanic and Latino Americans. The releases of Selena's works continue a promise Abraham Quintanilla told his family following his daughter's death, that he will continue to keep Selena's memory alive through her music. According to A.B. Quintanilla, Suzette Quintanilla, and Selena collectively agreed that if anything were to happen to any one of them, their wish would be to continue on with their music. A.B. said that one of Selena's wishes was for her to "never go away". Since Selena's death, her family has been criticized by fans and the media for exploiting the singer and cannibalizing on her murder by commercializing her repertoire.

In 1999, Selena remained EMI Latin's top-selling artist and outsold living musicians. From 1995 through 1999, Selena was the record company's top-selling performer, according to Nielsen SoundScan. Then-president of EMI Latin Jose Behar, who discovered the singer at the 1989 Tejano Music Awards, recognized that her contributions made EMI Latin "the house that Selena built". Industry executives collectively agreed on Selena's impact on EMI Latin, they credited Selena with propelling the label to the top of the US Latin music industry. To commemorate the label's tenth anniversary, they release All My Hits: Todos Mis Éxitos in March 1999. The album debuted atop the Top Latin Albums and Regional Mexican Albums chart, while it peaked at number 54 on the Billboard 200 chart. On January 22, 2000, it was revealed that EMI Latin was preparing to release the second volume of All My Hits: Todos Mis Éxitos. Three weeks later, the company revealed that All My Hits: Todos Mis Éxitos Vol. 2 would be released on Leap Day 2000. The album includes a heart-shaped commemorative pendant with a picture of Selena.

Music 
The album contains 16 tracks, ranging from songs found on Selena's Munequito de Trapo (1987) to the posthumous 1997 club remix of "Enamorada de Ti" (1990). The recording starts off with "Enamorada de Ti", remixed by A. B. in 1997 that was included on the "Is It the Beat?" maxi single in support of the Selena movie soundtrack. The remix version of "No Quiero Saber" on All My Hits: Todos Mis Éxitos Vol. 2, is taken from the official Latin album for the 1996 Atlanta Olympics. During recording sessions for "Techno Cumbia", the third track off the album and originally on Amor Prohibido (1994), A. B. encouraged Selena to rap with a New York accent similar to Rosie Perez. The fourth track, "A Million to One" was originally on Munequito de Trapo. Its modernized version on the album includes the saxophone, providing the song with a "sensuous flavor", according to Mario Taradell of The Dallas Morning News. 

The fifth song, "Fotos y Recuerdos" samples the 1983 single "Back on the Chain Gang" by the Pretenders. "Fotos y Recuerdos" originally appeared on Amor Prohibido, though Chrissie Hynde initially prevented Selena from releasing the song until keyboardist Ricky Vela provided Hynde an English-language translation of the lyrics. Writing for The Miami Herald, Tarradell described the sixth track "Si Una Vez" as having a more traditional Tejano sound than the rest of the tracks on Amor Prohibido but found it to be riddled with synthesizers and digital processing. The seventh track featured on the album, "No Me Queda Más" is taken from Selena's live Houston Astrodome performance on February 26, 1995, cited as her last concert before she was murdered. The eighth song, "Siempre Hace Frío", was originally intended for the Don Juan DeMarco (1995) soundtrack, but was shelved by music producers. Track number nine, "El Chico del Apartamento 512", is a lighthearted and comical song following the protagonist's attempts at finding "the guy in apartment 512". This is followed by "Munequito de Trapo", originally on the album of the same name, it is one of the earliest recordings done by Selena that is featured on the album. In contrast, the following track, "Captive Heart", was recorded a few weeks before Selena's death. Writing for the Corpus Christi Caller-Times, Karen Lister found "Captive Heart" to fit well with Selena's voice and range and enjoyed its pulsating drives that are hyperactively energetic. 

"Tu Robaste Mi Corazon", originally recorded as a duet with Emilio Navaira, was re-recorded with Pete Astudillo for Siempre Selena (1996), former backup dancer and vocalist of Selena's Los Dinos band. As with the seventh track, "Bidi Bidi Bom Bom" is taken from the live Houston Astrodome concert. Track number 14, "Aunque No Salga el Sol" features the re-recorded version found on Ven Conmigo (1990). The song was originally recorded by Selena in 1983 for Bob Grever's Cara Records. The next song, "Yo Fui Aquella" was originally a ranchera song and was redone with updated arrangements, becoming a sentimental ballad for Anthology (1998) "Cien Años", originally on the Preciosa (1988) album and features a new arrangement.

Critical reception 
Richard Torres of Newsday believed the second installment of All My Hits: Todos Mis Éxitos provides an appropriate overview of Selena's works. Torres finds the songs on the album as an example of the singer's versatility in recording songs of various genres, though found that the recording lacks more of Selena's perilous works; such as David Byrne on "God's Child (Baila Conmigo)" (1995) or her remake of the 1957 West Side Story track "A Boy Like That" (1995). He suggested that those songs could end up on the track listing of All My Hits: Todos Mis Éxitos Vol. 3 if one would be released by the label, ending his review that the second volume is an acceptable piece. A review on Allmusic opined that Selena's vocals on All My Hits: Todos Mis Exitos Vol. 2 rivals that of Madonna, finding that the songs featured on the album highlight Selena's ease with singing interchangeably between pop and Latin music. The reviewer found Selena's choice of covering pop standards "A Million to One" and "Back on the Chain Gang" ("Fotos y Recuerdos"), as examples of the singer's versatility. Ending the review, the critic called All My Hits: Todos Mis Exitos Vol. 2 an exemplification of Selena's talent as a singer and the potential successes she could have had it not been for her death. Writing for El Norte, Victor Ronquillo found All My Hits: Todos Mis Éxitos Vol. 2 as showcasing Selena's versatility and praised the inclusion of the Houston Astrodome performance of "Bidi Bidi Bom Bom" and called "Cien Años" a "beautiful song".

Commercial performance 
All My Hits: Todos Mis Éxitos Vol. 2 debuted at number three on the US Top Latin Albums chart with 10,500 units sold in its first week. The album was behind the debuts of Shakira's MTV Unplugged and Los Temerarios's En la Madrugada Se Fue, respectively. The album also debuted at number 157 on the US Billboard 200 and number two on the US Regional Mexican Albums chart. All My Hits: Todos Mis Éxitos Vol. 2 peaked at number one on the Top Latin Albums and Regional Mexican Albums chart in its fifth week. The album sold 8,000 units during the tracking week of Selena's death anniversary, the same amount sold in the previous week. Latin music columnist for Billboard magazine, John Lannert, attributed the flattened sales of the album during the singer's anniversary as an indication of the slowing down of Selena's retail power. Nonetheless, Lannert believed All My Hits: Todos Mis Éxitos Vol. 2 is a testament to Selena's "legendary status" and her ability to still peak at number one, despite her death occurring five years prior. The album dethroned Shakira's MTV Unplugged from the top spot of the Top Latin Albums chart and rose on the Billboard 200 to number 171. All My Hits: Todos Mis Éxitos Vol. 2 contributed to the increase of Latin albums sold in the United States for the month of March, along with Shakira and Los Temerarios' recent releases. 

After seven weeks of availability, All My Hits: Todos Mis Éxitos Vol. 2 ranked at number 42 on Billboards quarterly Top Latin Albums chart, which ranked the top-selling Latin albums from January through April 2000. In a mid-year music recap, All My Hits: Todos Mis Éxitos Vol. 2 ranked at number two on the Regional Mexican Albums list. Based on Nielsen SoundScan music sales, All My Hits: Todos Mis Éxitos Vol. 2 ranked as the 13th best-selling Latin album by September 9, 2000. All My Hits: Todos Mis Éxitos Vol. 2 ended 2000 as the 13th best-selling Top Latin Album and the second best-selling Regional Mexican Album. The album received a nomination for the Best Greatest Hits Album of the Year at the 2001 Billboard Latin Music Awards. In January 2003, All My Hits: Todos Mis Éxitos Vol. 2 was certified double Platinum (Latin) by the Recording Industry Association of America (RIAA), denoting 200,000 units consisting of shipments.

Track listing 
Credits adapted from the liner notes of All My Hits: Todos Mis Exitos Vol. 2 by EMI Latin.

Personnel 
Credits are adapted from the liner notes of All My Hits: Todos Mis Exitos Vol. 2.

Musicians
 Selena – lead vocals
 Ricky Vela – keyboardist
 Joe Ojeda – keyboardist
 Chris Pérez – guitarist
 Suzette Quintanilla – drums

Production
 Jose Behar – executive producer
 A. B. Quintanilla – producer, arranger, remixer
 Abraham Quintanilla – producer
 Malcom Harper – engineer
 Bill Scheurman – assistant engineer
 Brian "Red" Moore – audio mixer
 Luigi Giraldo – remastered

Charts

Weekly charts

Quarterly charts

Year-end charts

Certification

See also 

 2000 in Latin music
 Latin American music in the United States
 Women in Latin music

References

Citations

Websites 

2000 greatest hits albums
Compilation albums published posthumously
Selena compilation albums
EMI Latin compilation albums
Albums recorded at Q-Productions